Żyrmuny is the Polish name for the following locations:

 Žirmūnai – an administrative division (elderate) of Vilnius.
 Zhirmuny – a village in Hrodna  Voblast of Belarus; the birthplace of Karol Podczaszyński.